Brule Creek is a stream in the U.S. state of South Dakota.

Brule Creek takes its name after the Brulé Indians.

See also
List of rivers of South Dakota

References

Rivers of Union County, South Dakota
Rivers of South Dakota